Kozelets is an urban-type settlement in Chernihiv Raion, Chernihiv Oblast (province) of northern Ukraine. It hosts the administration of Kozelets settlement hromada, one of the hromadas of Ukraine. Kozelets is located on the Oster River, a tributary of the Dnieper. Population: 

The town was first mentioned in written documents in 1098, but its status as an urban-type settlement (a step below that of a city) was granted in 1924.

Notable attractions in the city includes the Cathedral of the Nativity of the Blessed Virgin designed in the Ukrainian Baroque style by architects Ivan Hryhorovych-Barskyi and Andrei Kvasov. Kozelets also houses several local food industries, and a veterinary technicum.

History
Kozelets was first mentioned in 1098 as a fortified town in the East Slavic state of Kievan Rus'. During times of the Polish–Lithuanian Commonwealth, Kozelets was known by the name Kozlohrad.

In the beginning of the seventeenth century, Kozelets was an important regional trade center. The town was also a sotnia town in the Pereiaslav and Kiev Regiment of the Cossack Hetmanate during the seventeenth-eighteenth centuries.

In 1656, Kozelets was granted the Magdeburg rights. The Kozelets Cossack Rada elected Yakym Somko as the Hetman of the Cossacks in 1662. After the Tatar invasion of 1679, Kozelets was partially destroyed.

In 1744 Empress Elizabeth of Russia stayed in Kozelets while making a pilgrimage to Kiev.

The city also served as a regional center of the Kyiv Governorate, Malorossiya, and Chernigov Governorates of the Russian Empire during the eighteenth-nineteenth centuries. At the end of the nineteenth century, Kozelets's population was 5,420.

After the breakup of the Russian Empire leading to the Russian Civil War, Kozelets became a part of the Soviet Union. In 1924, its status as a city was removed and given that of an urban-type settlement. During World War II, the Nazi Einsatzgruppen executed 125 of the town's Jews, a population that numbered 2,000 before the war.

Until 18 July 2020, Kozelets was the administrative center of Kozelets Raion. The raion was abolished in July 2020 as part of the administrative reform of Ukraine, which reduced the number of raions of Chernihiv Oblast to five. The area of Kozelets Raion was merged into Chernihiv Raion.

Attractions

Being a regimental Cossack town, Kozelets has some important architectural monuments. This includes the Regimental Chancellery Building (the current town hall), the Darahan Mansion complex, the Saint Michael's Church (built in 1784) and the Ascension Church (1864–66).

The town's main cathedral and architectural attraction is the Cathedral of the Nativity of the Blessed Virgin. The cathedral was built in the mid-eighteenth century in the late Ukrainian Baroque style by architects Ivan Hryhorovych-Barskyi and Andrei Kvasov. Funds for the construction of the cathedral were provided by Alexey and Kyrylo Rozumovsky (the latter was appointed Hetman in 1750).

Notable people from Kozelets
List of famous people from Kozelets:
 Yevstafiy Bogomolets (between 1750 and 1755–1811) - the mayor of Kozelets in 1789, direct ancestor of academician Alexander A. Bogomolets (1881–1946) and Olga Bogomolets (1966), M.D., the founder of Radomysl Castle
 Yuriy Levitansky (1922–1996), Russian poet 
 Boris Mankevsky (1883–1962), Ukrainian neurologist
 Vladimir Negovsky (1909–2003), Russian pathophysiologist
Maria Vasillievna Pavlova (née Gortynskaia) (1854-1939) paleontologist and academician

References

External links

 
 
 
 The Official Site of Radomysl Castle 
 The murder of the Jews of Kozelets during World War II, at Yad Vashem website.

Holocaust locations in Ukraine
Populated places established in the 11th century
Kozeletsky Uyezd
Urban-type settlements in Chernihiv Raion